Aleksandr Asanov (August 16, 1953 – October 2002) was a Kazakhstani sport shooter. He was born in Kzyl-Tuz, Almaty Region. He competed at the Summer Olympics in 1980 and 1992. In 1980, he placed sixth in the mixed trap event, while in 1992, he tied for 21st place in the mixed trap event.

References

1953 births
2002 deaths
People from Almaty Region
Trap and double trap shooters
Kazakhstani male sport shooters
Soviet male sport shooters
Shooters at the 1980 Summer Olympics
Shooters at the 1992 Summer Olympics
Olympic shooters of the Soviet Union
Olympic shooters of the Unified Team
Shooters at the 1994 Asian Games
Asian Games competitors for Kazakhstan